Walter Jung (8 August 1895 – unknown) was a German Nazi Party official and newspaper editor who was the first (unofficial) Gauleiter in the Saar when it was being administered by France and the United Kingdom under a League of Nations mandate.

Biography 
Walter Jung was born in Dudweiler (today, a borough of Saarbrücken) and worked as a smelting plant official there. He lived in his hometown of Dudweiler until 1928 and then moved to Saarbrücken. 

On 30 May 1926, at a time when the Nazi Party was still outlawed in the Saar Territory, Jung became the Party's unofficial Gauleiter there and also worked as the editor of the Nazi weekly Der Saardeutsche. When the ban on the Party was lifted, he officially enrolled as a member of the Saarbrücken Ortsgruppe (Local Group) on 28 November 1926 (membership number 47,851). However, he was replaced as Gauleiter by Jakob Jung on 8 December 1926. He then became the press officer for Gau Saar from that time until 1928. 

In addition to his Party post, Jung continued his involvement in propaganda, working as an editor and freelance contributor to the Völkischer Beobachter, the largest Party newspaper. In June 1928, he also became Editor-in-Chief of the new Nazi weekly, Saardeutsche Volksstimme (Saar German People's Voice), but was removed from this post the following year.

On 1 October 1929, Jung was expelled from the Party. This resulted from his statement during a court proceeding on 7 June 1929 in Saarlouis in which he distanced himself from anti-Semitic statements attributed to him against Felix Hanau (a Jewish businessman), in an attempt to avoid punishment. He submitted a request for reinstatement to the Party on 2 April 1931, but it subsequently was denied. Little is known about his later life.

References

Sources

External links 
  Walter Jung entry in the Saarland Biography

1895 births
Gauleiters
German newspaper editors
Nazi Party officials
Nazi propagandists
People from Saarbrücken
Year of death unknown